Killdeer is an unincorporated community in Rural Municipality of Old Post No. 43, Saskatchewan, Canada.

Geography 
Killdeer is located on the southern slopes of Wood Mountain Hills and just east of the Rock Creek Badlands. These badlands are also known as Killdeer Badlands.

See also
 List of communities in Saskatchewan

References 

Old Post No. 43, Saskatchewan
Unincorporated communities in Saskatchewan
Division No. 3, Saskatchewan